Jan de Koning (31 August 1926 – 8 October 1994) was a Dutch politician of the defunct Anti-Revolutionary Party (ARP) and later the Christian Democratic Appeal (CDA) party and social geographer.

De Koning joined the Dutch resistance against the German occupation in September 1943 and was at the time barely 17-years old. Following the end of World De Koning volunteered and enlisted in the Royal Netherlands East Indies Army as a Corporal serving in the Dutch East Indies from August 1945 until June 1948. De Koning studied Social geography at the Utrecht University obtaining a Master of Social Science degree. De Koning worked as a trade association executive for the Christian Farmers and Gardeners association (CBTB) from February 1955 until May 1971 and as a researcher at the Royal Academy of Arts and Sciences from November 1961 until January 1964. After the Senate election of 1969 De Koning was elected as a Member of the Senate on 16 September 1969 and served as a frontbencher and spokesperson for Agriculture. After the election of 1971 De Koning was elected as a Member of the House of Representatives on 10 May 1971 and served as a frontbencher and spokesperson for Agriculture and Development Cooperation. De Koning was also selected as a Member of the European Parliament on 22 September 1971 and dual served in both positions and served as Party Chairman from 11 May 1973 until 13 December 1975.

After the election of 1977 De Koning was appointed as Minister for Development Cooperation in the Cabinet Van Agt-Wiegel, taking office on 19 December 1977. After the election of 1981 De Koning was appointed as Minister of Agriculture and Fisheries in the Cabinet Van Agt II taking office on 11 September 1981. The Cabinet Van Agt II fell just seven months into its term and was replaced by the caretaker Cabinet Van Agt III with continuing his position and also took over the portfolio of Netherlands Antilles Affairs taking office on 29 May 1982. After the election of 1982 De Koning was appointed as Minister of Social Affairs and Employment and also retained the portfolio of Netherlands Antilles and Aruba Affairs in the Cabinet Lubbers I taking office on 4 November 1982. After the election of 1986 De Koning again continued his offices in the Cabinet Lubbers II. De Koning was appointed as acting Minister of the Interior following a cabinet reshuffle serving from 3 February 1987 until 6 May 1987. In July 1989, De Koning announced that he wouldn't stand for the election of 1989 and declined to serve in new cabinet.

De Koning continued to be active in politics and in December 1989 was nominated as a Member of the Council of State on 1 January 1990. De Koning also became active in the public sector as non-profit director and serves on several state commissions and councils on behalf of the government, and worked as a distinguished professor of Social geography at the University of Groningen from January 1991. In August 1994, De Koning was diagnosed with terminal cancer and died just three months later in October 1994 at the age of 68. De Koning was known for his abilities as a skillful manager and effective consensus builder. He holds the distinction as the longest-serving Minister of Social Affairs with 7 years, 3 days in Dutch History.

Decorations

References

External links

Official
  Drs. J. (Jan) de Koning Parlement & Politiek
  Drs. J. de Koning (ARP) Eerste Kamer der Staten-Generaal

 

 
 

1926 births
1994 deaths
Anti-Revolutionary Party MEPs
Chairmen of the Anti-Revolutionary Party
Christian Democratic Appeal politicians
Commandeurs of the Légion d'honneur
Deaths from cancer in the Netherlands
Dutch corporate directors
Dutch expatriates in Indonesia
Dutch geographers
Dutch members of the Dutch Reformed Church
Dutch nonprofit directors
Dutch people of World War II
Dutch resistance members
Dutch trade association executives
Grand Crosses of the Order of the Crown (Belgium)
Knights Grand Cross of the Order of Orange-Nassau
Knights of the Order of the Netherlands Lion
Ministers for Development Cooperation of the Netherlands
Ministers of Agriculture of the Netherlands
Ministers of Defence of the Netherlands
Ministers of Kingdom Relations of the Netherlands
Ministers of the Interior of the Netherlands
Ministers of Social Affairs of the Netherlands
Members of the Council of State (Netherlands)
Members of the House of Representatives (Netherlands)
Members of the Senate (Netherlands)
Members of the Social and Economic Council
MEPs for the Netherlands 1958–1979
Politicians from The Hague
Politicians from Utrecht (city)
People from Zwartewaterland
Dutch people of the Indonesian National Revolution
Recipients of the Resistance Memorial Cross
Reformed Churches Christians from the Netherlands
Royal Netherlands East Indies Army personnel
Social geographers
Academic staff of the University of Groningen
Utrecht University alumni
Academic staff of Utrecht University
Academic staff of Vrije Universiteit Amsterdam
20th-century Dutch businesspeople
20th-century Dutch civil servants
20th-century Dutch educators
20th-century Dutch military personnel
20th-century Dutch politicians
20th-century Dutch scientists
20th-century geographers